Unstoppable is a 2018 South Korean action crime film directed by Kim Min-ho. It stars Ma Dong-seok and Song Ji-hyo. The film revolves around a former legendary gangster turned seafood distributor, who goes on a crusade to rescue his wife from a human trafficking ring. It was released on November 22, 2018.

Plot
Dong-chul is a meek seafood distributor who tries to hit big bucks with various business opportunities that eventually go bust, losing a lot of money, much to the annoyance of his wife Ji-soo. One evening, while trying to convince her about a new opportunity in the fishing industry with the supply of King Crabs and opening a new restaurant. Dong-chul’s car is rear-ended by the car of Gi-tae, a female trafficker, who is attracted to Ji-Soo and kidnaps her the next night. When Dong-Chul arrives home after work, He learns that Ji-Soo is kidnapped, where he receives a bag full of money from Gi-tae in exchange for the "purchase"of Ji-soo. 

However, Gi-tae is unaware that Dong-chul was a legendary fighter and gangster, who is now living a quiet life on the insistence of Ji-Soo. Dong-Chul and his friend Choon-Sik and retired Inspector named Gomsajang begins a search which leads them to a casino where they find that the gangsters are smuggling Lorazepam and plates from Jangseang port. They find the manager Park In-Chang of "Business Club". Dong-chul checks In-Chang's car where he finds that In-Chang was present at the time of Ji-Soo's kidnapping. Dong-Chul tries to nab In-Chang, but escapes. With the help of the police department, Dong-Chul meets and learns from a deceased wife's husband. The husband reveals that Gi-tae had offered him money in exchange to sell his wife, who was in coma. 

The husband reluctantly accepts and felt guilty for his actions, where he gives a file to Dong-Chul and dies by jumping off the police headquarters. Dong-Chul finds the visiting card of a finance company headed by Dae-Sung, who is Gi-tae's associate (Dae-Sung had gave the visiting card to Dong-chul previously when they accidentally crashed their car). Dong-Chul confronts Dae-Sung where he kidnaps him, which is witnessed by Gi-too from the CCTV cameras. Gi-tae calls Dong-Chul and blackmails him to kill Dae-Sung in exchange for Ji-Soo's survival. Dong-Chul pretends to kill Dae-Sung and saves Ji-Soo. Without knowing, Gi-tae tells Dong-Chul to bring the money. 

The trio enquire Dae-Sung where they learn that the husbands are brainwashed into selling their wives in exchange for money. They manage to steal the money from the police station (as Dong-Chul had given the bag to the police). Dong-Chul reaches the Gangwon province and defeats all of the syndicate's henchmen including In-Chang and a car chases ensues between Gi-tae and Dong-Chul where Dong-Chul manages to defeat Gi-tae and hand him over to the cops and reunites with Ji-Soo, where he also testifies about the syndicate's activities to the cops. The King-Crab is successfully delivered, where Dong-Chul, Ji-Soo and Choon-sik inaugurate their restaurant, and celebrate with a happy meal of King Crab.

Cast
Ma Dong-seok as Dong-chul
Song Ji-hyo as Ji-soo
Kim Sung-oh as Gi-tae
Kim Min-jae
Park Ji-hwan as Choon-sik
 Bae Noo-ri

Production
Principal photography began on May 4, 2018, and wrapped on August 3, 2018.

Reception
 

References

External links
 

 Unstoppable at Naver

2018 films
Showbox films
2018 crime action films
South Korean crime action films
2010s South Korean films
2010s Korean-language films